Qudrat Ullah Shahab (or Qudratullah Shahab, ; 26 February 191724 July 1986) was an eminent Urdu writer and civil servant from Pakistan. 

Shahab holds the distinction of having served as the Principal Secretary to three heads of state; Governor General Ghulam Muhammad, President Iskander Mirza, and President Ayub Khan. He went on to serve as the Ambassador of Pakistan to the Netherlands in 1962 and later as Information Secretary of Pakistan and Education Secretary of Pakistan.

Early life
Shahab was born in Gilgit on 26 February 1917. His father, Abdullah Sahib, belonged to the Arain tribe of Chimkor Sahib village, district Ambala, and was a student at Muhammadan Anglo-Oriental College and a protégé under the supervision of Sir Syed Ahmed Khan. Abdullah Sahib later migrated from Aligarh and settled down in Gilgit. Shahab first rose to prominence when, at sixteen, an essay he penned was selected for the first prize in an international competition organized by the Reader's Digest, London, and, in 1941, for being the first Muslim from Jammu and Kashmir qualifying for the Indian Civil Service. He later moved to Karachi, Pakistan, after the separation of the sub-continent and took charge as Under-Secretary (Import and Export), Ministry of Trade, of the newly-formed independent state. He also served as the first Secretary General (later the position was renamed as Chief Secretary) of Govt. Of Azad Jammu and Kashmir. Qudrat Ullah was deputy commissioner of Jhang. He was behind many government schemes launched for the benefit of writers and intellectuals.

Literary works
Shahab himself published in English and Urdu languages for contemporary newspapers and magazines of Pakistan Writers' Guild, founded at Karachi in January 1959.

Shahab's essay "Maaji" poetically outlines the simplicity of his mother and the relationship that his parents shared, detailing migration, governorship, family dynamics, and death in a short chapter.

He is best known for his autobiography Shahab Nama.

Spiritualism
The real disclosure came in the final chapter of Shahab Nama that alluded to an out-of-world personality whom he used to call Ninety as his spiritual guide. After Shahab Nama published, which was actually after Shahab's death, Mufti wrote his autobiography, Alakh Nagri, and openly discussed the hidden traits of Shahab's life. Mufti wrote in the foreword of the book:

Legacy
Mumtaz Mufti made him the subject of his autobiography Alakh Nagri and later dedicated another book Labbaik. Bano Qudsia, a veteran Urdu writer, wrote a book Mard-e-Abresham on Shahab's personality. A collection of essays about Qudrutullah Shahab has been compiled in a book, Zikr-e-Shahab.

Death

Shahab died on 24 July 1986 in Islamabad and is buried in H-8 Graveyard, Islamabad, Pakistan.

Honorary stamp
On 23 March 2013, Pakistan Post issued a stamp with denomination of Rs. 15 under the "Men of Letters" series in the honour of Qudratullah Shahab.

Books
Shahab Nama  – autobiography (1986)
Ya khuda,یا خُدا  – novel
Mān̲ jī, ماں جی – short stories 
Surk̲h̲ fītāh, سُرخ فِیتہ – short stories
Nafsāne, نفسانے – short stories
Shahāb nagar, شہاب نگر – literary miscellany
Pathans – an essay about Pashtuns

References

External links
Qudratullah Shahab's grave from Daily Times
 Book Review of Shahab Nama in English.
 Listen to ShahabNama by Qudratullah Shahab

1917 births
1986 deaths
Ambassadors of Pakistan to the Netherlands
Pakistani autobiographers
Pakistani male short story writers
Pakistani short story writers
Government College University, Lahore alumni
Indian Civil Service (British India) officers
Pakistani civil servants
Pakistani humorists
Pakistani scholars
Pakistani Sufis
People from Ambala
Punjabi people
Shrines in Pakistan